Qiao Liang (born 9 January 1955), is a retired major general in the People's Liberation Army Air Force (PLAAF), military theorist, and author. He is the deputy director of the creative department of the PLAAF, the deputy secretary-general of the Council for National Security Policy Studies, and a member of the Chinese Writers' Association. In 2007, he presented a lecture series on China Central Television (CCTV) about the Thirty-Six Stratagems.

Synopsis
Qiao was born in 1955 to a military family. He enlisted in 1972, and served in a variety of technical posts in the Lanzhou Military District. He started writing fiction in 1974, and he joined the Chinese Writers' Association in 1984. In 1999, he co-authored the book Unrestricted Warfare with Wang Xiangsui, which explored how the United States could hypothetically be defeated by technologically inferior forces, and how the concept of warfare could be expanded beyond traditional battlefield engagements.

In 2016, Qiao and Wang published an updated edition of Unrestricted Warfare.

Major works

Military theory

 Unrestricted Warfare (with Wang Xiangsui) 
 Global Military Rankings
 On the Qualities of Military Officers
 An Outline PLAAF Offense and Defense
 On Army Reform
 The Arc of Empire
 Unrestricted Warfare and its Opponents (revised edition)

Literary works

 Thunder Echo Canyon
 The Gates of Judgment Day
 Army Banner
 A Distant Wind
 Chronicles of Cities and Bosses

References

External links
One belt, one road - Speech by General Qiao Liang

Living people
1955 births
People's Liberation Army Air Force generals
People's Republic of China writers
Chinese military writers
Military theorists